The Canadian Chamber of Commerce in Shanghai (CanCham Shanghai) is a nonprofit organization and the only Canadian chamber of commerce in China.  Its mission is to support Canadian businesses in East China by  helping businesses develop their networks and marketing opportunities as well as to cultivate a thriving Canadian community in Shanghai. The Canadian Chamber of Commerce in Shanghai is located at the Jing`An Kerry Centre in the Jing`An district of Shanghai. The Canadian Chamber of Commerce is led by 12 member board of directors.  The Executive Director and the staff of the Chamber are responsible for the daily operations of the Chamber. Matt Whately is the current Executive Director.

History
Originally called the Canadian Business Forum (CBF), the Canadian Chamber of Commerce in Shanghai was formed in 1996 by a group of locally based Canadian companies and entrepreneurs .  In 2001, the CBF formed a partnership with the Canada China Business Council (CCBC) and was renamed the CCBC Shanghai Chapter.  In the ensuing years, the CCBC Shanghai Chapter worked with the CCBC to develop the Canadian Business community in Shanghai and the Yangtze Delta Region at large while maintaining its operational independence and its identity as a non-profit business organisation.  In June 2008, it was resolved and voted by the membership of the CCBC Shanghai Chapter to separate from the CCBC and establish the Canadian Chamber of Commerce.  On June 18, 2008, The Canadian Chamber of Commerce was officially inaugurated in name.

Mission
From the Canadian Chamber of Commerce in Shanghai website: "The Canadian Chamber of Commerce in Shanghai is the pre-eminent organization supporting Canadian business and community interests. CanCham Shanghai informs and promotes Canadian interests in Eastern China and fosters connections within the Canadian business community with their Chinese counterparts."
Promote the development of trade, commerce and investment between Canada and China
Provide a forum in which the Canadian business community in China can identify and discuss common commercial issues in China
Represent, express and give effect to the views of the Canadian business community in China regarding trade, investment, finance, industry and related matters
Work with Chinese organizations, governmental departments and the Chinese business community on matters of mutual interests
Maintain relations with other independent business associations and organizations.

Membership
Membership of CanCham Shanghai consists of Canada-China joint ventures and wholly owned Canadian companies, ranging from some of the largest and best-recognized corporations to medium and small-sized enterprises. Current corporate members include Air Canada, Canpotex, CN, CP, Manulife-Sinochem, Soprema, and Teck.

Board of directors

The Canadian Chamber of Commerce is led by twelve member board of directors, which consists of eleven elected directors and one ex officio director. The ex officio director must be the Senior Trade Commissioner of the Canadian Consulate General in Shanghai.  The directors are either Canadian MNCs' representatives or Canadian entrepreneurs running their own business in East China. Board members are responsible for forming and driving the policies as well as providing guidance on all the activities of the Chamber.

The Consul General is also the honorary president of the Canadian Chamber of Commerce in Shanghai.

Board members 2009
Honorary President: Nadir Patel, Canadian Consul General of Shanghai
Chair: Dr. Mark Ceolin
Vice Chair: John Chan
Vice Chair ex officio: Jordan Reeves (Deputy Consul General)
Treasurer: Brian Castle
Directors: Anthony Fong, Charles Wang, Fred Spoke, Keith Lomason, Line Robillard, Michael Murphy, Robert Martin, Sharon Wong

Board members 2011-2012
Honorary President: Rick Savone, Canadian Consul General of Shanghai
Chair: Sharon Wong 
Vice Chair: Winston Kan
Vice Chair ex officio: Eric Pelletier
Treasurer: Nancy Kingsley Hu
Directors: Anthony Fong, Mark Ceolin, Thomas Cheong, Eunice Wang, John McDonald, Radley MacKenzie, Alan McMillan, Olivier Brault.

Board members 2013-2014
Honorary President: Rick Savone,  Canadian Consul General of Shanghai
Chair: Richard S. Grams
Vice Chair: Colin Bogar
Vice Chair Ex-Officio: Eric Pelletier
Treasurer: Douglas Sibley 
Directors: Colin Bogar, Olivier Brault, Richard S. Grams, Ann Louise Herten, Lonny Kubas, Radley Mackenzie, John E. McDonald, Guy R. A. Mills, David Stavros, Olivia Zhou

Board members 2015–2017 
 Honorary President: Weldon Epp, Canadian Consul General of Shanghai
 Chair Colin Bogar
 Vice Chair: Olivier Brault
 Vice Chair ex officio: Ryan Baerg
 Treasurer: Doug Sibley
 Directors: Jim Athansopolous, Russel Aydin, Donghai Du, Jackie Greenizan, Sean Goff, Alan Lu, Olivia Zhou, Richard Ling

Board members 2017–2019 
 Honorary President: Weldon Epp, Canadian Consul General of Shanghai
 Chair: Jim Athansopolous
 Vice Chair: Jackie Greenizan
 Vice Chair ex officio: Ryan Baerg
 Treasurer: Wendy Wang
 Directors: Russel Aydin, Donghai Du, Tony Jaw, Jean-Francois Lepine, Frank O'Brien, Eunice Wang, Maggie Wang, Kai Zhang

Board members 2019–Present 
 Honorary President: Dave Murphy, Canadian Consul General of Shanghai 
 Chair: Kai Zhang 
 Vice Chair: Mikael Charette 
 Vice Chair ex officio: Jean-Christian Brillant 
 Treasurer: Vivienne Gu
 Directors: Olivier Brault, Mark Ceolin, Victor Cui, Donghai Du, Veronique Gong, Tony Jaw,  Gabriel Lagunes, Jean-Francois Lepine

Events
CanCham's primary goal is to facilitate relations between the Canadian and Chinese community in Shanghai, and accordingly they host many events throughout the year, as well as support various inter-chamber functions in Shanghai. These events are both business-related and social in nature, and include workshops, seminars, conferences, mixers and networking events, and 'Canuck Connection' social events.  Some notable annual community events include:

 Spring Alumni Mixer 
 Canada Day
 La Fête Nationale du Québec
 Hockey Night in Shanghai 
 Maple Leaf Ball 
 Canadian Alumni Thanksgiving 
 Christmas

Highlights
 In June 2008 CanCham Shanghai is officially recognized as "The Canadian Chamber of Commerce in Shanghai", at the Annual General Meeting.
 In September 2008 CanCham Shanghai hosts "Theory & Practice the First Annual Symposium on Sustainable Business Practices"
 In November 2008 the Canadian Chamber of Commerce in Shanghai organizes Hello-Allo Canada, a three-day street festival celebrating Canadian culture on Yandang Road in Shanghai.
 On December 4, 2009 the Canadian Chamber of Commerce in Shanghai and the Canada-China Business Council co-host a dinner welcoming Prime Minister Stephen Harper to Shanghai,
 In May 2010 CanCham Shanghai organizes a business luncheon for the  Mayor of Montreal.
 In June 2010 CanCham hosts a business luncheon for the Québec Minister of Finance Raymond Bachand.
 On June 4, 2011 CanCham Shanghai hosts the 1st Asia-Pacific CanCham Forum with keynote speakers Chinese economist Dr. Fan Gang, Eric Siegel, President and CEO of Export Development Canada (EDC),  as well as the Honourable Peter Van Loan, Minister of International Trade.
 On July 1, 2010 CanCham Shanghai, along with the Montreal and Vancouver Pavilion celebrates Canada Day at the Canada Pavilion at Expo 2010 Shanghai in the presence of the Right Honourable Michaëlle Jean, Governor General of Canada.
 On August 16, 2010 CanCham Shanghai and CN organizes reception to celebrate the signing of an MOU between the Shanghai No. 9 People's Hospital and the Smile China Project.
 On September 20, 2010  CanCham Shanghai facilitates business roundtable with Vancouver mayor Gregor Robertson, Vancouver delegates and local business leaders
 On July 20, 2011  CanCham Shanghai and CCBC hosts a business luncheon for John Baird, the Minister of Foreign Affairs for Canada.
 On September 1, 2011 the Québec Government Office in Shanghai and CanCham Shanghai hosts a luncheon for  Jean Charest, the Premier of Quebec.
 On November 7, 2011 the British Columbia Trade Office and CanCham Shanghai hosts the BC Alumni Ambassadors Reception with Premier of British Columbia, Christy Clark
 On November 9, 2011 CanCham Shanghai and CN hosts the Canada-China Business Leaders' Dinner with Canada's Minister of Natural Resources, Joe Oliver.
 On February 10, 2012 The Canadian Consulate with CanCham Shanghai, CanCham Hong Kong and the Canada China Business Council hosts the Canada China Business Dinner with Keynote Speaker Prime Minister Stephen Harper
 On September 17, 2012 CanCham, JP Star and CN host the Council of the Federation with Keynote Speakers, Premier Bob McCleod - The North West Territories and Premier Greg Selinger - Manitoba
 On October 22, 2012, CanCham Shanghai hosts Mayor of Victoria Dean Fortin Luncheon 
 On January 14, 2013, CanCham Shanghai hosts reception in honour of the Ontario Trade Mission to China for the Honourable Dalton McGuinty, Premier of Ontario and his accompanying Trade Mission Delegates
 On October 20, 2013, Governor General David Johnston awards medals to 4 CanCham Members at Reception for the Friends of Canada: 
-Karen Cvornyek President and Regional Managing Principal, Asia
-Mark Ceolin, former Chair of CanCham Shanghai, CEO of Red Gate International 
-Marie-Lucie Spoke, Founder & Managing Director, Community Roots China
-Ryan Pyle, adventurer, Mandarin House
 On February 20, 2014, CanCham Shanghai organized a luncheon between Canadian Consul General Rick Savone and its young professional members. This was a unique opportunity for the next generation of Canadian leaders to better understand Sino-Canada relations and discuss upcoming opportunities and challenges.
 On March 21, 2014, Canada's Citizenship and Immigration Minister, the Honourable Chris Alexander, speaks to CanCham Shanghai Members at the Canada-China Business Dinner in Shanghai.
 on March 25, 2014, CanCham Shanghai held its Annual General Meeting at the Shanghai Peace Hotel. Canadian Consul General in Shanghai Rick Savone gave the opening remarks and CanCham Shanghai's Chair Richard Grams gave a retrospective of 2013.
 On May 19, 2014, CanCham Shanghai held a dinner marking the occasion of the visit of the Honourable Ed Fast, Canada's Minister of International Trade. Special thanks to the dinner's sponsor: CN.
 On May 31, 2014, CanCham Shanghai presented Hockey Night in Shanghai III: Canada vs The World. More than 2,000 fans filled the Feiyang Skating Center to watch an exciting ice hockey game.
 on June 21, 2014, The Canadian Chamber of Commerce in Shanghai, in partnership with the Quebec Office in Shanghai, CN and Hungry Lung's Kitchen, held the Fête nationale du Québec celebrations in Shanghai.
 on June 28, 2014, CanCham in Shanghai held a beach party to celebrate Canada Day at the Bund Beach.
 on August 4, 2014, The CanCham Shanghai team welcomed Vivian Xie as their new executive director.
 On September 4, 2014, CanCham hosted the Nova Scotia Premier, Stephen McNeil.
 On October 20, 2014, CanCham hosted a dinner with the premier of Manitoba, Greg Selinger.
 On October 27, 2014, CanCham hosted the premier of Québec, Philippe Couillard.
 On October 28, 2014, the chamber hosted a luncheon with the premier of Ontario, Kathleen Wynne.
 On January 16, 2015, the Canadian Chamber of Commerce in Shanghai hosted a delegation from the Northwest Territories who were on a trade mission to China.
 On March 8, 2015, Rebecca Copelovici became the new executive director of the Chamber.
 On March 30, 2015, CanCham Shanghai held its Annual General Meeting at the Fairmont Peace Hotel in Shanghai. Acting Canadian Consul General in Shanghai and Senior Trade Commissioner, as well as Vice Chair Ex-officio of CanCham Eric Pelletier gave the opening remarks and presided over the official board election. Vice Chair Colin Bogar gave a review of 2014's Activities, followed by the 2014 Financial Report presented by Treasurer Doug Sibley.
 On April 28, 2015, the Canadian Chamber of Commerce celebrated the opening of its new office in the Jing'An Kerry Centre in Shanghai. The new logo of CanCham was also unveiled at the event, as well as other rebranding done to mark the beginning of a new era in CanCham's operations. The Chamber announced their CSR Partnership with Community Roots China, and launched their CanCham group membership insurance plan with Manulife-Sinochem.
 On June 27, 2015, CanCham hosted the Canada Day Beach Party on the Bund in Shanghai.
 On September 19, 2015, the Chamber held its annual Maple Leaf Ball at the Grand Hyatt Hotel in Pudong, Shanghai. The theme was "Northern Lights".
 From October 15 to October 28, 2015, CanCham led a delegation of investors and professionals in Nova Scotia, Canada.
 On January 13, 2016, CanCham hosted a seminar on China's 13th Five-Year-Plan.
 On March 22, 2016, the Chamber hosted its Annual General Meeting, as well as the Consul General of Canada in Shanghai, Weldon Epp, who presented his Consulate Briefing for 2016.

References

External links
 CanCham Shanghai website

Canada–China relations
Chambers of commerce in China
Organizations based in Shanghai
Organizations established in 1996
1996 establishments in China
Foreign trade of China
Foreign trade of Canada